Michael Bormann is a German singer. He was a founding and longtime member of the hard rock band Jaded Heart. He has been involved with several other groups as their lead vocalist, having accepted contracts to record his vocals on albums rather than being a full-time member of the bands.

Biography 
Bormann's first step into the music scene was a high school band that he and his brother Dirk formed called High Voltage.  The group changed their name to T.A.X. and then that evolved into Jaded Heart.  His first chance at being with a "made band" was in 1993 when Gaby Hauke (Accept fame) called up Bormann to ask if he was interested in joining Bonfire.  His time with the band was short lived as the band went their separate ways in 1994.  By then, Jaded Heart had released their first album so he was still in the music spotlight.  Worth noting, Bormann and ex-Bonfire mate Angel Schleifer reunited three years later as Charade.

Bormann carried on with Jaded Heart while still maintaining involvement in other projects until 2004.  After the release of the band's seventh album, the group fired him.  He proceeded to continue with his solo career while also being the owner of his own recording studio, RMB Rock-Studios, in Duisburg, Germany.  He was nominated for a few categories for the 50th and 51st Grammy Awards in 2008 and 2009.  Through the years, Bormann has worked with noted musicians such as J.R. Blackmore (son of Ritchie Blackmore of Deep Purple and Rainbow), Jochen 'Zeno' Roth (brother of Uli John Roth of Scorpions fame), Jos Zoomer (from Vandenberg) and Anette Blyckert of Alyson Avenue and Nightwish.

In 2013, after working together in the band The Sygnet (from 1997 to 2000), Bormann joined guitarist Alex Beyrodt and drummer André Hilgers in the band Silent Force replacing previous vocalist D.C. Cooper. The first Silent Force album with Bormann as vocalist is called Rising From Ashes and was released in 2013.

Band membership

Discography 
 1983: High Voltage – Scheiß Schule single
 1984: High Voltage – Believe Me single
 1985: High Voltage – Without Love single
 1987: T.A.X. – On The Run
 1991: German Rock Project – Let Love Conquer The World
 1992: Letter X – Born into Darkness
 1993: J.R. Blackmore Group – Still Holding On
 1994: Jaded Heart – Inside Out
 1996: Jaded Heart – $laves And Master
 1998: Charade – Charade
 1998: Jaded Heart – Mystery Eyes
 1998: The Sygnet – Children of the Future
 1999: Jaded Heart – IV
 2001: Jaded Heart – Diary
 2001: German Rock Stars – Wings Of Freedom
 2002: Rain – House of Dreams
 2002: Michael Bormann – Michael Bormann
 2002: Jaded Heart – The Journey Will Never End
 2003: Biss – Joker in the Deck
 2004: Jaded Heart – Trust
 2004: 20th Century Boys – Beware of the Rex!
 2004: Charade – II
 2006: Michael Bormann – Conspiracy
 2006: Zeno – Runway to the Gods
 2006: Rain – Stronger
 2007: Bloodbound – Book of the Dead
 2007: Redrum – No Turning Back
 2008: Michael Bormann – Capture The Moment
 2009: The Trophy – The Gift of Life
 2010: Michael Bormann – Different
 2010: Shining Line – AOR All Star Project
 2011: J.R. Blackmore – Voices Part I
 2011: Alyson Avenue – Changes
 2013: Redrum – Victims of Our Circumstances
 2013: Powerworld – Cybersteria
 2013: Assignment – Inside of the machine
 2013: Silent Force – Rising From Ashes
 2014: Michael Bormann – Love Is Magic
 2015: Grindhouse – Chapter One
 2015: Michael Bormann – Closer
 2018: Michael Bormann – Rock Hard
 2019: Michael Bormann´s Jaded Hard – Feels Like Yesterday

References

External links 
Michael Bormann Page – Official website for Michael Bormann
Michael Bormann's Jaded Hard Page – Official website for Michael Bormann's Jaded Hard
Charade Project – Official website for Charade
Rain – Official website for Rain
Idea – Official website for Idea
Zeno Roth – Official website for Zeno Roth

German rock singers
Living people
Silent Force members
Year of birth missing (living people)